Cyprian Broodbank,  (born 26 December 1964) is a British archaeologist and academic. Since October 2014, he has been Disney Professor of Archaeology at the University of Cambridge and director of the McDonald Institute for Archaeological Research. From 2010 to 2014, he was Professor of Mediterranean Archaeology at University College London.

Early life and education
Broodbank was born on 26 December 1964. He studied modern history at the University of Oxford, graduating in 1986 with a Bachelor of Arts (BA) degree. He then went on to study for a Master of Arts (MA) degree in Aegean and Anatolian prehistory at the University of Bristol, graduating in 1987. He undertook postgraduate study at the Faculty of Classics, University of Cambridge, and completed his Doctor of Philosophy (PhD) degree in 1996. His supervisor was John F. Cherry, and his doctoral thesis was titled This small world the great: an island archaeology of the early Cyclades.

Academic career
Broodbank began his academic career as a junior research fellow at University College, Oxford, from 1991 to 1993. In 1993, he joined University College London as a lecturer in Aegean archaeology based in the Institute of Archaeology. He was promoted to senior lecturer in 2001 and to reader in 2009. He was a visiting fellow at All Souls College, Oxford, in 2005. In October 2010, he was appointed Professor of Mediterranean Archaeology.

In November 2013, it was announced that he had been elected to the position of Disney Professor of Archaeology at the University of Cambridge. He took up the appointment in October 2014. In addition, he is the Director of the McDonald Institute for Archaeological Research, and a Professorial Fellow of Gonville and Caius College, Cambridge.

He was awarded the 2003 James R. Wiseman Book Award by the Archaeological Institute of America for his monograph An Island Archaeology of the Early Cyclades (Cambridge University Press, 2001). He was also awarded the 2001 Runciman Award by the Anglo-Hellenic League for the monograph. His monograph The Making of the Middle Sea: A History of the Mediterranean from the Beginning to the Emergence of the Classical World (Thames and Hudson. 2013) has been described as 'an unprecedented work of scholarship; it is unlikely ever to be matched' and as a 'landmark publication'.

Personal life
In 2006, Broodbank married Dr Lindsay Close Spencer. Together they have two children; one daughter and one son.

Honours
On 11 October 2007, Broodbank was elected a Fellow of the Society of Antiquaries (FSA). In 2014, he was awarded the Wolfson Prize for History for his book The Making of the Middle Sea. On 16 July 2015, he was elected a Fellow of the British Academy (FBA).

Selected works

References

1964 births
Living people
British archaeologists
Academics of the UCL Institute of Archaeology
Fellows of the Society of Antiquaries of London
People educated at Westminster School, London
Alumni of Christ Church, Oxford
Alumni of the University of Bristol
Alumni of King's College, Cambridge
Disney Professors of Archaeology
20th-century English historians
21st-century British historians
Historians of the Mediterranean
Fellows of Gonville and Caius College, Cambridge
Classical archaeologists
Fellows of the British Academy